John Collier Jones (1770 – 7 August 1838) was an academic administrator at the University of Oxford in England.

The son of Richard Jones of Plympton Erle, Devon, Jones was educated at Exeter College, Oxford, matriculating in 1788 aged 18, graduating B.A. 1792, M.A. 1796, B.D. 1807, D.D. 1819, and holding a fellowship 1792–1799.

He was Rector of Exeter College, Oxford from 6 November 1819 until his death in 1838. He was also Vice-Chancellor of Oxford University from 1828 to 1832.

His portrait was painted by Thomas Phillips and a mezzotint engraving was produced by Samuel Cousins and published by James Ryman in 1834.
His papers are in the Bodleian Library at Oxford.

References

1770 births
1838 deaths
Rectors of Exeter College, Oxford
Vice-Chancellors of the University of Oxford